Sergey Kalugin (born April 9, 1967) is a Russian acoustic guitarist, singer-songwriter and poet, the leader of the Russian art/progressive rock band Orgia Pravednikov. Kalugin's guitar mastery combines classical and rock guitar trends, his music covers such different genres as progressive rock, Baroque music, flamenco; his poetics deals with such themes as Hermeticism, Kabbalah, vampirism, Christian esoterism, Gnosticism, Buddhism etc., and also includes some satirical component.

Biography 
Sergey Kalugin was born in Moscow, USSR, into the family of a forester, his mother being a scientist. In 1986 he completed his studies in a musical college as a classical guitarist. At about the same time he began writing poems and songs, and in 1986 he had his first public performance, due to the help of Yuri Naumov. Kalugin's initial acoustic style was reminiscent of the Soviet bards, though at the same time influenced by Russian acoustic rocker Alexander Bashlachev. Kalugin also created a heavy metal band in 1986, but this act foundered a year later without giving a single concert.

In 1989 Kalugin recorded his debut album named Путь (Path), containing his bard-like songs. However, Kalugin's dissatisfaction with his manner of playing grew; he was greatly impressed by the achievements of both his friend and competitor, Yuri Naumov, who has since been widely considered one of the best Russian acoustic rock guitarists. Yuri Naumov was the key influence that made possible Kalugin's musical breakthrough of the 1990s.

In the same year, Kalugin featured in the film Socialist City by Belgian film director and producer of Russian descent Michel Drachoussoff, and recorded his second album, also produced by Michel Drachoussoff, Moscou.

Career 

Kalugin embarked on a full-time professional musical activity in 1993. A year later he released his first successful album Nigredo featuring flamboyant complex lyrics and music, the latter unusual for both Russian bard and acoustic rock as it had been before. Due to this fact and good promotion (Kalugin and his songs from the Nigredo were featured on the Russian mainstream Radio of Russia, with its millions of listeners at the time) he became known among both Russian rock and bard audience.

In 1995 Kalugin created a precursor of the Orgia, Dikaya Okhota (Wild Hunt), which acted till 1998.

In 1999 the band Orgia Pravednikov was formed by Kalugin in association with an art rock band called Artel; Kalugin became the leader of the new act.

By 2013 the band has released eight albums. In 2013 Kalugin made it to the shortlist of the nationwide Nashe Radios annual awards in the vocals nomination (with the band, the latest maxi-single and a song in other nominations) by poll of the audience of the radio. Sergey Kalugin with his band took part in the open-air rock festival Nashestvie 2013.

In parallel to the Orgia Pravednikov Kalugin also keeps acting as a solo performer.

 Awards 
In 1995 the FoZ.D. foundation run by an association of well-known Moscow-based rock musicians named Sergey Kalugin Russia's Best Acoustic Guitarist 1994.Olga Arefieva's official website  (Russian)

In 2013 Sergey Kalugin was nominated as a vocalist, and also a song rendered by him (though not authored), on the shortlists of the nationwide pop rock radio Nashe Radio'''s annual awards.

 Political views 
In 1999 in an interview to a social-patriotic weekly Zavtra edited by Alexander Prokhanov Sergey Kalugin confessed to supporting the GKChP during the conservative 1991 August Putsch, claiming that he was the only one not afraid of coming out and walking around the Red Square (while hundreds of thousands of people were protesting against the GKChP). Later he did not express pro-Soviet views, but confessed to being a monarchist. In 2012 Sergey Kalugin expressed his support of Pussy Riot during the criminal prosecution of the Russian activist punk band. Kalugin also took part in rallies supporting the girls, an action far from typical of conservatively oriented artists in Russia.

 Discography 

 Solo albums 
 1989 – Put (Path)
 1989 – Moscou 1994 – Nigredo 1998 – Neslo (live, poems performed by Kalugin at a recital)
 2006 – Rosarium'' (in cooperation with guitarist of the Orgia Pravednikov Alexey Burkov)

As part of Orgia Pravednikov

References

External links 
 Orgia Pravednikov official site
 Sergey Kalugin's blog
 Sergey Kalugin's acoustic performance in Saint Petersburg

Acoustic guitarists
Russian guitarists
Russian male guitarists
Russian rock singers
Russian singer-songwriters
Living people
1967 births
Russian male singer-songwriters
Russian activists against the 2022 Russian invasion of Ukraine